Indianthus is a genus of plants. It contains only one species, Indianthus virgatus (Roxb.) Suksathan & Borchs, native to India, Sri Lanka and the Andaman Islands.

References

Marantaceae
Monotypic Zingiberales genera
Flora of Sri Lanka
Flora of India (region)
Flora of the Andaman Islands